Marie Edith Jeanne Bonlieu (18 April 1934 – 23 December 1995) was a French alpine skier. She competed in the women's downhill at the 1956 Winter Olympics. She was a member of the Order of the Solar Temple and took her own life in a mass suicide with other cult members.

References

External links
 

1934 births
1995 suicides
French female alpine skiers
Olympic alpine skiers of France
Alpine skiers at the 1956 Winter Olympics
Order of the Solar Temple
Suicides by firearm in France
Sportspeople from Yonne
20th-century French women